The 1995 CPISRA European Soccer Championship was the European championship for men's national 7-a-side association football teams. CPISRA stands for Cerebral Palsy International Sports & Recreation Association. Athletes with a physical disability competed. The Championship took place in England 1995.

Football 7-a-side was played with modified FIFA rules. Among the modifications were that there were seven players, no offside, a smaller playing field, and permission for one-handed throw-ins. Matches consisted of two thirty-minute halves, with a fifteen-minute half-time break.

Participating teams and officials

Teams

Venues 
The venues to be used for the World Championships were located in Nottingham.

Group stage

Group 1

Group 2

Knockout stage

Semi-finals

Finals 
Position 3-4

Final

Statistics

Ranking

See also

References

External links 
 CP voetbal football 7-a-side Interlands
 Cerebral Palsy International Sports & Recreation Association (CPISRA)
 International Federation of Cerebral Palsy Football (IFCPF)

1995 in association football
1995
1994–95 in English football
Paralympic association football